Colobura annulata, the new beauty, is a butterfly of the family Nymphalidae. It is found in Central America (as far north as southern California and northern Texas) and the northern parts of South America.

References 

Coeini
Colobura
Butterflies described in 2001